is a private university in Ōita Prefecture, Japan. It has campuses at the cities of Beppu and Ōita.
The predecessor of the school was founded in 1908, and it was chartered as a university in 1954.

Alumni 
Nobuko Iwaki - politician

External links
 

Educational institutions established in 1908
Private universities and colleges in Japan
Universities and colleges in Ōita Prefecture
Beppu, Ōita
1908 establishments in Japan